Adrien Gilbert (10 September 1931 – 1 January 2010) was a Canadian weightlifter. He competed in the men's middleweight event at the 1956 Summer Olympics.

References

External links
 

1931 births
2010 deaths
Canadian male weightlifters
Olympic weightlifters of Canada
Weightlifters at the 1956 Summer Olympics
Place of birth missing
Commonwealth Games medallists in weightlifting
Commonwealth Games bronze medallists for Canada
Weightlifters at the 1958 British Empire and Commonwealth Games
20th-century Canadian people
21st-century Canadian people
Medallists at the 1958 British Empire and Commonwealth Games